The second election to Ards and North Down Borough Council, part of the Northern Ireland local elections on 2 May 2019, returned 40 members to the council via Single Transferable Vote. The Democratic Unionist Party once again won a plurality of seats.

Election results

Note: "Votes" are the first preference votes.

The overall turnout was 43.80% with a total of 50,206 valid votes cast. A total of 660 ballots were rejected.

Districts summary

|- class="unsortable" align="centre"
!rowspan=2 align="left"|Ward
! % 
!Cllrs
! %
!Cllrs
! %
!Cllrs
! %
!Cllrs
! %
!Cllrs
! %
!Cllrs
! % 
!Cllrs
!rowspan=2|TotalCllrs
|- class="unsortable" align="center"
!colspan=2 bgcolor="" | DUP
!colspan=2 bgcolor="" | Alliance
!colspan=2 bgcolor="" | UUP
!colspan=2 bgcolor="" | Green
!colspan=2 bgcolor=""| SDLP
!colspan=2 bgcolor="" | Sinn Féin
!colspan=2 bgcolor="white"| Others
|-
|align="left"|Ards Peninsula
|bgcolor="#D46A4C"|47.8
|bgcolor="#D46A4C"|3
|10.6
|1
|10.6
|1
|4.1
|0
|20.7
|1
|2.5
|0
|3.7
|0
|6
|-
|align="left"|Bangor Central
|bgcolor="#D46A4C"|26.1
|bgcolor="#D46A4C"|2
|18.3
|1
|17.7
|1
|14.2
|1
|0.0
|0
|0.0
|0
|23.8
|1
|6
|-
|align="left"|Bangor East and Donaghadee
|bgcolor="#D46A4C"|31.2
|bgcolor="#D46A4C"|2
|17.1
|1
|30.1
|2
|9.7
|0
|0.0
|0
|0.0
|0
|11.9
|0
|6
|-
|align="left"|Bangor West
|30.5
|1
|bgcolor="#F6CB2F"|32.5
|bgcolor="#F6CB2F"|2
|17.2
|1
|16.6
|1
|0.0
|0
|1.2
|0
|2.0
|0
|5
|-
|align="left"|Comber
|bgcolor="#D46A4C"|37.9
|bgcolor="#D46A4C"|2
|23.2
|1
|21.4
|1
|5.7
|0
|0.0
|0
|0.0
|0
|11.7
|0
|5
|-
|align="left"|Holywood and Clandeboye
|26.6
|1
|bgcolor="#F6CB2F"|38.7
|bgcolor="#F6CB2F"|2
|13.5
|1
|19.2
|1
|0.0
|0
|0.0
|0
|2.1
|0
|5
|-
|align="left"|Newtownards
|bgcolor="#D46A4C"|32.4
|bgcolor="#D46A4C"|3
|20.0
|2
|14.6
|1
|4.5
|0
|0.0
|0
|0.0
|0
|28.6
|1
|7
|-
|- class="unsortable" class="sortbottom" style="background:#C9C9C9"
|align="left"| Total
|33.4
|14
|22.2
|10
|17.8
|8
|10.2
|3
|3.2
|1
|0.5
|0
|12.6
|4
|40
|-
|}

District results

Ards Peninsula 

2014: 3 x DUP, 1 x SDLP, 1 x UUP, 1 x Alliance
2019: 3 x DUP, 1 x SDLP, 1 x UUP, 1 x Alliance
2014-2019 Change: No change

Bangor Central

2014: 2 x DUP, 2 x UUP, 1 x Alliance, 1 x Greens
2019: 2 x DUP, 1 x Alliance, 1 x Greens, 1 x UUP, 1 x Independent 
2014-2019 Change: Independent gain from UUP

Bangor East and Donaghadee

2014: 3 x DUP, 1 x UUP, 1 x Alliance, 1 x Independent
2019: 2 x UUP, 2 x DUP, 1 x Alliance, 1 x Independent
2014-2019 Change: UUP gain from Independent, Independent leaves DUP

Bangor West

2014: 2 x DUP, 1 x Alliance, 1 x UUP, 1 x Green
2019: 2 x Alliance, 1 x DUP, 1 x UUP, 1 x Green
2014-2019 Change: Alliance gain from DUP

Comber

2014: 2 x DUP, 1 x Alliance, 1 x UUP, 1 x TUV
2019: 2 x DUP, 1 x Alliance, 1 x UUP, 1 x TUV
2014-2019 Change: No change

Holywood and Clandeboye

2014: 2 x DUP, 1 x Alliance, 1 x Green, 1 x UUP
2019: 2 x Alliance, 1 x Green, 1 x DUP, 1 x UUP
2014-2019 Change: Alliance gain from DUP

Newtownards

2014: 3 x DUP, 2 x UUP, 1 x Alliance, 1 x Independent
2019: 3 x DUP, 2 x Alliance, 1 x UUP, 1 x Independent
2014-2019 Change: Alliance gain from UUP

Changes during the term

† Co-options

‡ Changes in affiliation

– Suspensions
Colin Kennedy (DUP) was suspended from the council for six weeks from Friday 18 June 2021.

Last update 8 February 2023.

Current composition: see Ards and North Down Borough Council.

References

2019 Northern Ireland local elections
21st century in County Down
Elections in County Down